Imogen Slaughter is a British actress who was educated at Framlingham College and graduated from the Oxford School of Drama. Her credits include Elizabeth in David Starkey's four-part 2000 television documentary about Elizabeth I (directed by Mark Fielder and Steven Clarke) and as Penny in the Trafalgar Studios's production of Ordinary Dreams; Or How to Survive a Meltdown with Flair.

Notes

External links
 

Year of birth missing (living people)
Living people
British actresses